Lleyton Hewitt was the defending champion, but did not participate.

Wildcard James Blake won the title, defeating Feliciano López 3–6, 7–5, 6–1 in the final.

Seeds
All seeds receive a bye into the second round.

Draw

Finals

Top half

Section 1

Section 2

Bottom half

Section 3

Section 4

References

External links
Main Draw

Pilot Pen Tennis
2005 Pilot Pen Tennis